The Government of the 24th Dáil or the 19th Government of Ireland (14 December 1982 – 10 March 1987) was the government of Ireland formed after the November 1982 general election. It was a coalition government of Fine Gael and the Labour Party led by Garret FitzGerald as Taoiseach.

The 19th Government lasted for  days.

19th Government of Ireland

Nomination of Taoiseach
The members of the 24th Dáil first met on 14 December 1982. In the debate on the nomination of Taoiseach, the Fianna Fáil leader and outgoing Taoiseach Charles Haughey, and Fine Gael leader Garret FitzGerald were both proposed. The nomination of Haughey was defeated with 77 votes in favour to 88 against, while the nomination of FitzGerald was carried with 85 in favour and 79 against. FitzGerald was then appointed as Taoiseach by president Patrick Hillery.

Members of the Government
After his appointment as Taoiseach by the president, Garret FitzGerald proposed the members of the government and they were approved by the Dáil. They were appointed by the president on the same day.

Notes

Attorney General
On 14 December 1982, Peter Sutherland SC was appointed by the president as Attorney General on the nomination of the Taoiseach. He resigned as Attorney General on 12 December 1984 on his nomination as European Commissioner. On 13 December 1984, John Rogers SC was appointed by the president as Attorney General on the nomination of the Taoiseach.

Ministers of State
On 14 December 1982, the Government on the nomination of the Taoiseach appointed Seán Barrett to the post of Minister of State at the Department of the Taoiseach with special responsibility as Government Chief Whip. On 16 December 1982, the Government appointed the other Ministers of State on the nomination of the Taoiseach.

Confidence in the government
After the February 1986 reshuffle, including the failure of FitzGerald to move Barry Desmond from the Department of Health and having misinformed the Dáil about the resignation of ministers of state who were subsequently sacked, Charles Haughey sought to move a motion of no confidence in the government. This was debated as a motion of confidence in the Taoiseach, proposed by Tánaiste Dick Spring. The motion of confidence was carried on 21 February 1986 by a vote of 82 to 77.

In June 1986, Joseph Bermingham had resigned from the Labour Party, leaving the coalition parties in a minority. In October 1986, moved a motion of no confidence in the government. This was debated as a motion of confidence in the Taoiseach and the government, proposed by Taoiseach Garret FitzGerald. The motion of confidence was carried on 23 October 1986 by a vote of 83 to 81. Bermingham voted with the government; Seán Treacy, who had resigned from Labour in February 1985, voted with the opposition.

Government policy

The "republican crusade" flagged by Garret Fitzgerald when he was previously in government in 1981 was progressed with some changes in policy on Northern Ireland and social issues.

Economics
The government resorted to high marginal tax rates to curb the national debt, which had increased when spending commitments accrued under the 1977–81 government's expansion of the public sector became unsustainable after the 1979 energy crisis. High taxes and high unemployment brought a return to high net emigration, a long-established Irish flow which had temporarily reversed in the 1970s. An economic policy document, "Building on reality", was published in 1984.

Constitutional referendums
The Eighth Amendment to recognise the right to life of the unborn had been proposed by the previous government. It was adopted by the FitzGerald government, but not supported by Labour. An attempt to amend the wording was unsuccessful. The amendment was approved in a referendum in September 1983.

The Ninth Amendment of the Constitution of Ireland permitted legislation to allow non-Irish citizens to vote in Dáil elections.

A referendum to ease the ban on divorce was defeated in 1986.

Contraception
A bill to ease restrictions on contraception was passed in 1985. The failure of Desmond O'Malley to vote against this legislation led to his expulsion from Fianna Fáil. O'Malley later established the Progressive Democrats in December 1985.

Northern Ireland
The government's New Ireland Forum was a prelude to the Anglo-Irish Agreement signed in 1985.

See also
Dáil Éireann
Constitution of Ireland
Politics of the Republic of Ireland

References

1982 establishments in Ireland
1987 disestablishments in Ireland
24th Dáil
Cabinets established in 1982
Cabinets disestablished in 1987
Coalition governments of Ireland
Governments of Ireland